Asha Mishra is an Indian writer, best known for her Maithili book Uchaat, for which she won a Sahitya Akademi Award in 2014.

References 

Living people
Indian writers
Indian women writers
Recipients of the Sahitya Akademi Award in Maithili
Year of birth missing (living people)